WEC 21: Tapout was a mixed martial arts event held on June 15, 2006. WEC 21's main event was a fight between Rob McCullough and Ryan Healy.

Results

See also
 World Extreme Cagefighting
 List of World Extreme Cagefighting champions
 List of WEC events
 2006 in WEC

References

External links
Official WEC website

World Extreme Cagefighting events
2006 in mixed martial arts
Mixed martial arts in California
Highland, California
2006 in sports in California